Mindaugas Mizgaitis (born 14 October 1979) is a retired heavyweight Greco-Roman wrestler from Lithuania. He competed at the 2004 and 2008 Olympics and won a bronze medal in 2008; he was promoted to the second place after disqualification of Khasan Baroyev in November 2016. Mizgaitis also competed in several world and European championships between 1999 and 2010 with the best result of third place at the 2010 European and fourth place at the 2003 World Championships.

References

External links
 

Sportspeople from Kaunas
Olympic wrestlers of Lithuania
Wrestlers at the 2004 Summer Olympics
Wrestlers at the 2008 Summer Olympics
1979 births
Living people
Olympic medalists in wrestling
Medalists at the 2008 Summer Olympics
Lithuanian male sport wrestlers
Universiade medalists in wrestling
Universiade bronze medalists for Lithuania
Olympic silver medalists for Lithuania
European Wrestling Championships medalists
Medalists at the 2005 Summer Universiade